Israel David Bascón Gigato (born 16 March 1987), sometimes known simply as Israel, is a Spanish former footballer who played as a right midfielder.

Most of his professional career, which was bothered by physical problems, was spent at Betis.

Club career

Betis
Bascón was born in Utrera, Province of Seville. A product of Real Betis's youth system, he made his debut for the first team against Real Sociedad, on 4 December 2004 (nine minutes, 0–1 away loss). During that season he made a further seven La Liga appearances, adding three in the Copa del Rey where he scored his first goal for the Andalusians, against CD Mirandés.

Bascón played again in just eight league matches in the following campaign, all but one as a substitute. He also appeared in both European competitions, coming from the bench against Liverpool and R.S.C. Anderlecht in the group stage of the UEFA Champions League.

During the 2006 off-season, in August, vastly underplayed at Betis due to the presence of Joaquín in his position, Israel spent time at Chelsea on trial after a move to Real Madrid Castilla failed to materialise. Nothing came of it, however, and the player then left for Mérida UD on a loan deal.

Shortly after, Bascón was involved a serious car accident where he broke a collar bone and suffered several contusions. After that he returned to Betis, still being registered mainly for the club's reserves which competed in the third division.

Bascón scored his second competitive goal for Betis on 19 September 2010, heading from a Miguel Lopes cross past Real Valladolid's Jacobo in a 2–1 home win. He contributed with 21 games – only four starts however, 644 minutes of action – during the season, as the Verdiblancos returned to the top level after two years out.

Xerez
In the following seasons, Bascón continued to compete in division two, with Xerez CD. On 11 February 2013, he joined Superleague Greece's Veria F.C. on loan until June.

Albacete
On 13 August 2013, Bascón signed a one-year contract with third-tier team Albacete Balompié. In November 2016, after undergoing three knee surgeries in only two years, the 29-year-old retired from football.

References

External links

1987 births
Living people
People from Utrera
Sportspeople from the Province of Seville
Spanish footballers
Footballers from Andalusia
Association football midfielders
La Liga players
Segunda División players
Segunda División B players
Tercera División players
Betis Deportivo Balompié footballers
Real Betis players
Mérida UD footballers
Xerez CD footballers
Albacete Balompié players
Veria F.C. players
Spain youth international footballers
Spanish expatriate footballers
Expatriate footballers in Greece
Spanish expatriate sportspeople in Greece